The Missouri–Nebraska football rivalry was an American college football rivalry between the Missouri Tigers and Nebraska Cornhuskers. The rivalry was the second oldest in the Big 12 Conference and third oldest west of the Mississippi River. However, it ended following the 2010 game, when Nebraska and Missouri met in league play for the last time prior to Nebraska's 2011 move to the Big Ten Conference. In November 2011, Missouri announced that it would join the Southeastern Conference in July 2012.

Series history
The Tigers and Cornhuskers have met 104 times since 1892, dating back to the formation of the Western Interstate University Football Association. Missouri forfeited its first game against Nebraska because the Missouri team, which was segregated, refused to play against George Flippin, an African-American Nebraska Player.

The rivalry was competitive through 1978, with Nebraska leading the series 37–32–3 up to that point. However, starting in 1979, Missouri lost the next 24 games.

Following a close overtime game in Columbia in 1997, the rivalry began to gain attention once again. A miraculous touchdown catch by Nebraska's Matt Davison tied the ballgame at the end of regulation, which allowed #1 Nebraska to barely escape a loss to unranked Missouri. Davison caught the ball after it bounced off the hands, chest, foot of a Missouri safety and foot of teammate Shevin Wiggins in what is now known as the famous Flea Kicker play. Nebraska went on to share the national title with Michigan. An unranked Missouri finally broke through in 2003 with a 41–24 victory over #10 Nebraska. Fans, players, and coaches from both sides had remarked that in recent years the rivalry had returned to the levels of intensity that was felt prior to the late 1980s.

A Missouri campus tradition came to an end following the Tigers' win over Nebraska in 2005. Anytime the goalposts were torn down at Faurot Field, they were carried out of the stadium, around the columns, and then finally to Harpo's Bar and Grill at 29 S. Tenth Street in downtown Columbia, in a tradition that dated back to 1971. Students rushed the field and tore down the goal posts following the Missouri wins in 2003 and 2005. Following the 2005 incident, 20 fans were arrested on trespassing charges and the university announced it would be forming an internal task force to reduce fan rowdiness. In May 2006, Missouri athletic director Mike Alden announced that collapsible goalposts would be installed for the upcoming 2006 season, hoping to end any future incidents with students rushing the field to tear down the goalposts.

End of the rivalry
On June 11, 2010, the Nebraska Cornhuskers announced that its regents unanimously voted to end the university's affiliation with the Big 12 Conference, and would be joining the Big Ten Conference beginning with the 2011 season. Therefore, the October 30, 2010 contest between these two teams was the last unless the programs meet in a future non-conference game or postseason bowl game. On November 6, 2011, the Missouri Tigers announced their decision to leave the Big 12 for the Southeastern Conference beginning with the 2012 season.

Due to both Nebraska's and Missouri's move to the Big Ten and SEC respectively, there are actually several opportunities for the teams to possibly meet in a bowl game each season. Three bowls feature the Big Ten and SEC as their contracted matchup, in addition to the possibility that other bowls can take teams from the Big Ten or SEC if their contracted conferences fail to produce enough bowl-eligible teams.

Victory Bell
The Victory Bell (sometimes known as the Missouri–Nebraska bell) was awarded to the winner of the Nebraska and Missouri football game annually. The exchange was organized by the Innocents Society of Nebraska and QEBH of Missouri.

The tradition dated back to 1892 when these teams first met, when the bell was taken from a church in Seward, Nebraska by members of Nebraska fraternities Phi Delta Theta and Delta Tau Delta. At the time, the members of the two fraternities occupied the same house. When the two groups moved into separate houses, there was a dispute over who should keep the bell. Annual scholastic or athletic contests were held, with the bell being used as a trophy. This rivalry abated, yet still the ownership of the bell was left in question.

In 1926, Missouri athletic director Chester D. Brewer suggested an annual award be established for the annual Missouri-Nebraska football game. The bell was selected to be the prize to end the conflict between the fraternities, and the letters 'M' and 'N' were engraved on opposite sides of the bell. The exchange was coordinated by the Innocents Society and Missouri's prestigious Q.E.B.H. Society. Missouri won the first game in 1927 7–6. The scores from the games up through 2005 are engraved on the bell.

With Nebraska's victory over Missouri in the final league meeting of these teams on October 30, 2010, Nebraska's Memorial Stadium became the apparent final home of the Victory Bell, though a commemorative bell will be produced for permanent display at the University of Missouri. It is possible that the Victory Bell could change hands again if the teams meet in a future non-conference game or postseason bowl game.

Game results

See also 
 List of NCAA college football rivalry games
 List of most-played college football series in NCAA Division I

References

College football rivalries in the United States
Missouri Tigers football
Nebraska Cornhuskers football